The Keurgeuz Birinchi Ligaseu or Kyrgyz First League is the second highest division of Kyrgyzstan football, below the Kyrgyz Premier League.

Champions

References
Kyrgyzstan – List of final tables (RSSSF)

 
2
Second level football leagues in Asia
Sports leagues established in 1992